Vermillion is a city in Dakota County, Minnesota, United States. The population was 441 at the 2020 census.

Geography

The main routes include Main Street (190th Street East / County 62), Fischer Avenue (County 66), and Goodwin Avenue (County 85).

U.S. Highway 52 and Northfield Boulevard (County 47) are both nearby.

The Vermillion River flows through the community.  Nearby places include Hampton, New Trier, Hastings, Rosemount, Coates, Farmington, and Northfield.

Vermillion is located entirely within Vermillion Township geographically but is a separate entity.

Demographics

2010 census
As of the census of 2010, there were 419 people, 156 households, and 121 families living in the city. The racial makeup of the city was 96.4% White, 0.2% African American, 1.4% Asian, and 1.9% from two or more races. Hispanic or Latino of any race were 0.2% of the population.

There were 156 households, of which 32.7% had children under the age of 18 living with them, 67.3% were married couples living together, 5.8% had a female householder with no husband present, 4.5% had a male householder with no wife present, and 22.4% were non-families. 18.6% of all households were made up of individuals, and 10.3% had someone living alone who was 65 years of age or older. The average household size was 2.67 and the average family size was 3.03.

The median age in the city was 40.6 years. 22.2% of residents were under the age of 18; 8.1% were between the ages of 18 and 24; 26.3% were from 25 to 44; 31.8% were from 45 to 64; and 11.7% were 65 years of age or older. The gender makeup of the city was 52.5% male and 47.5% female.

2000 census
As of the census of 2000, there were 437 people, 150 households, and 118 families living in the city. The racial makeup of the city was 97.03% White, 0.46% African American, 0.23% Pacific Islander, 1.37% from other races, and 0.92% from two or more races. Hispanic or Latino of any race were 2.06% of the population.

There were 160 households, out of which 38.8% had children under the age of 18 living with them, 68.1% were married couples living together, 4.4% had a female householder with no husband present, and 26.3% were non-families. 20.6% of all households were made up of individuals, and 9.4% had someone living alone who was 65 years of age or older.  The average household size was 2.73 and the average family size was 3.19.

In the city, the population was spread out, with 25.4% under the age of 18, 9.6% from 18 to 24, 31.6% from 25 to 44, 21.3% from 45 to 64, and 12.1% who were 65 years of age or older.  The median age was 36 years. For every 100 females, there were 104.2 males.  For every 100 females age 18 and over, there were 98.8 males.

The median income for a household in the city was $61,667, and the median income for a family was $68,036. Males had a median income of $40,521 versus $30,417 for females. The per capita income for the city was $22,552.  None of the families and 0.9% of the population were living below the poverty line, including no under eighteens and 7.9% of those over 64.

In popular culture
A song named after the town was released by Vermillion native Reggie Bauer in 2020 under the alias "CyFi."

References

Cities in Dakota County, Minnesota
Cities in Minnesota